Seyi Ẹdun  popularly known as Ẹja nla is a Nigerian actress and film producer. She is well known for her film Ẹja nla, and she is also a wife to the actor, Adeniyi Johnson

Early life and education 
Seyi Ẹdun is a native of Ayetoro Egbado in Ogun State. She received her primary and secondary school education from Tunyo Nursery and Primary school and Anglican Girls Grammar School in Surelere, Lagos. In 2011, She obtained her first degree from Obafemi Awolowo University.

Personal life 
Seyi Ẹdun is married to Adeniyi Johnson

Career 
Ẹdun joined the film industry in 2009 through her sister, who is a scriptwriter. In the same year, she enrolled in Wisdom Caucus theatre school and graduated in 2011. In the year of her graduation, she produced her first film titled Ẹja nla.

Filmography 
She has featured in the following movies

Oko Mi
Ota mi
Case Closed
Wonuola
Asewo
Eja nla (2011)

References 

Yoruba actresses
Nigerian film actresses
Nigerian film producers
Obafemi Awolowo University alumni
Actresses from Ogun State
Living people
Year of birth missing (living people)